44th parallel may refer to:

44th parallel north, a circle of latitude in the Northern Hemisphere
44th parallel south, a circle of latitude in the Southern Hemisphere